UWF Fury Hour is a professional wrestling television program that was produced by Universal Wrestling Federation (UWF) and broadcast weekly every Monday night on SportsChannel America from October 1, 1990, to September 23, 1991. The show was part of the network's Feet, Fists and Fury programming block that also included kickboxing and boxing.

A shoot occurred during a semifinal SportsChannel Television Championship Tournament match between Steve Ray and Steve Williams that aired in May 1991. Allegedly, Herb Abrams thought Ray was sleeping with his wife and paid Williams extra money to rough Ray up during the bout. Ray would claim years later that this was a worked shoot.

After months without television, the company signed a deal with Prime Ticket for new episodes. These new episodes taped at Spartanburg Memorial Auditorium began airing as UWF Thunder Hour on Sunday nights in July 1992.

In March 1995, existing Fury Hour and Thunder Hour episodes were repackaged to a half-hour format and aired daily on ESPN2. Those same 24 repackaged episodes later re-aired on ESPN Classic between 2008 and 2013. Steve Ray tried suing ESPN Classic in 2014 for using his likeness during these rebroadcasts, but was unsuccessful.

ESPN Classic Canada reran the original one-hour format episodes of Fury Hour and Thunder Hour in 2004.

Commentators

Commissioners

Recurring segments

See also
UWF Beach Brawl
UWF Blackjack Brawl

References

External links

1990 American television series debuts
American professional wrestling television series
ESPN original programming
Prime Sports
SportsChannel
Universal Wrestling Federation (Herb Abrams)